The English county of Shropshire has a fairly large railway network, with 19 National Rail stations on various national lines; there are also a small number of heritage and freight lines, including the famous heritage Severn Valley Railway running along its eastern border with Worcestershire.

The majority of the county's public rail services are run by Transport for Wales Rail; the remainder are run by West Midlands Trains (under their West Midlands Railway brand) and Avanti West Coast.

National Rail services

National Rail services in Shropshire are centred about Shrewsbury station (all other 'national rail' stations in Shropshire have a direct train service to Shrewsbury, which is the county town), which is managed by Transport for Wales. The station is at the junction of the Wolverhampton to Shrewsbury Line, Shrewsbury to Chester Line, the Welsh Marches Line (between Cardiff and Manchester) and the Cambrian Line (towards Welshpool). Craven Arms station is at the junction between the Welsh Marches Line and the Heart of Wales Line, although services on the Heart of Wales Line begin at Shrewsbury rather than Craven Arms itself. There are direct train services from Shrewsbury (and elsewhere in the county) to the cities of Manchester, Birmingham and Cardiff, as well as the port at Holyhead where regular ferries to Dublin depart.

There are no electrified railways, as such, in the county despite the surrounding railway nodes of Crewe, Chester and Wolverhampton all being electrified (the funicular Bridgnorth Cliff Railway, although electrically powered, is cable worked). This has meant that since the mid-1990s rail privatisation, there has been a reluctance to establish a direct service to London by the cross-country railway companies (previously British Rail ran direct trains from Shrewsbury to London), notably Virgin Trains West Coast who previously ran services to London Euston from the county in 2000. There was a direct service to London Marylebone, provided by the open-access company Wrexham & Shropshire, which operated from 28 April 2008 to 28 January 2011 and used diesel locomotives. On 11 December 2014, Virgin Trains recommenced direct services between Shrewsbury and London Euston.

Freight only lines
There are two freight only lines in operation in the Telford area. One is the line from Madeley Junction on the Shrewsbury to Wolverhampton Line to Ironbridge Power Station via the historic industrial area of Coalbrookdale. The other is the newly restored line from Wellington to the Telford International Railfreight Park in Donnington which links the Terminal at Donnington with the Shrewsbury to Wolverhampton Line.

There is also the short Abbey Loop line in Shrewsbury which is generally only used by freight trains.

The Gobowen to Blodwell line, which runs through Oswestry, has been a mothballed line since the 1980s. It previously served a small number of stone quarries in the area. In 2008 the line was bought by Shropshire County Council and will likely be used in part by the Cambrian Heritage Railways being set up in the area (by the Cambrian Railways Trust and Society, see Heritage section below) and also as a cycle path from Oswestry to Gobowen.

Former railways

There are many closed lines in Shropshire, including

 Tenbury and Bewdley Railway which ran from the now-closed Woofferton station on the Shrewsbury to Hereford line and passing briefly through Herefordshire through Tenbury Wells, Cleobury Mortimer, and then into Worcestershire to Bewdley
 Cleobury Mortimer and Ditton Priors Light Railway
 Bishop's Castle Railway was a 19 mile line running from just north of Craven Arms station to Bishop's Castle
 Severn Valley Railway; although part of the southern section has been restored, the line used to continue north from Bridgnorth to Sutton Bridge Junction in Shrewsbury
 Craven Arms station to Wellington via Much Wenlock and a junction with the Severn Valley Railway at Buildwas. A small section of this line has been reopened as the Telford Steam Railway. There was also a branch via Madeley to Shifnal.
 Shropshire and Montgomeryshire Railway (the 'Potts Railway'), an 18-mile line from Shrewsbury Abbey to Llanymynech with a branch to Criggion
 Minsterley branch line was a 9-mile line from Shrewsbury station to Minsterley, with a further branch to Snailbeach
 Stafford to Wellington line ran from Wellington to Stafford via Newport and Gnosall. Although closed in the 1960s, new track has been restored from east of Wellington to Donnington in 2008. It is hoped the next phase would be to reconnect Newport to the railway network. The line is in the top 36 'Lines that should reopen' listing published by the Campaign for Better Transport.
 Wellington to Nantwich in Cheshire, via Market Drayton, with another line running into Stoke-on-Trent in Staffordshire from Market Drayton
 Oswestry to Newtown, passing through Shropshire
 Oswestry, Ellesmere and Whitchurch Railway, a constituent line of the Cambrian Railways system
 The Tanat Valley Light Railway, running from Llanyblodwel up the Tanat valley to Llangynog in Powys
 Wrexham and Ellesmere Railway, a constituent line of the Cambrian Railways system which ran for a short distance within Shropshire
 Whitchurch and Tattenhall Railway which ran for a short distance in Shropshire before passing into Cheshire

Many were closed in the 1960s, although the county did not fare too badly under Dr Beeching's massive nationwide railway cuts. The Heart of Wales Line was saved from closure. However, some previously major railway centres in the county, such as Oswestry, Newport and Market Drayton, now have no public railways.

Heritage railways

There are three heritage railways in Shropshire: the Severn Valley Railway from Bridgnorth to Kidderminster (in Worcestershire), the Telford Steam Railway at Horsehay, and two restored stretches of the Cambrian Railways, being run by Cambrian Heritage Railways between Oswestry and Weston Wharf, and between Llynclys and Pant.

Cambrian Heritage Railways also (since taking on the former Cambrian Railway Society CRS) aims to restore part of the Potteries, Shrewsbury & North Wales Railway at Nantmawr for use as a heritage railway. The CHR have a second operating base at Oswestry railway station, with a small collection of locos and rolling stock.

As well as the heritage only lines, the national lines of Shropshire witness a regular number of special charter trains with heritage diesel and steam locomotives and historic carriage stock in operation.

Stations
Here are listed the 19 National Rail stations in current use in the county.

1 Sometimes written as "Hoptonheath".
2 Although the town of Knighton is in Powys, Wales, the railway station is in Shropshire, England.

Tunnels

There are four railway tunnels in use at present in Shropshire:

Oakengates Tunnel - the longest tunnel in the county, located between Oakengates and Telford Central stations, on the Shrewsbury to Wolverhampton Line
Ludlow Tunnel - a short tunnel just to the south of Ludlow station, on the Welsh Marches Line
Heath Hill Tunnel - located between Lawley Common and Horsehay on the Telford Steam Railway, this tunnel was reopened to trains with track relayed through it in early 2009, as part of the heritage railway's northward extension to Lawley
Knowlesands Tunnel - a very short tunnel on the Severn Valley Railway, located between Bridgnorth and Hampton Loade

A notable disused tunnel exists running beneath High Town of Bridgnorth, which once carried the railway from Bridgnorth station northwards towards the Ironbridge Gorge. The tunnel continues to be maintained and is in good condition. There is the possibility of the Severn Valley Railway extending northwards through the tunnel, with the tunnel's owner BRB (Residuary) Ltd offering the heritage railway first refusal, however there would be substantial difficulties in reinstating the railway beyond the tunnel to the north of Bridgnorth.

See also
Rail transport in Great Britain
History of rail transport in Great Britain

References

Rail transport in Shropshire
Shropshire